Lempholemma corticola is a species of lichen in the family Lecanoraceae. Known from Greece, it was described as new to science in 2011.

References

Lichens described in 2011
Lichens of Southeastern Europe
Lichinomycetes
Lichen species
Taxa named by Toby Spribille